Jagannath Temple, Rayagada, (known as Sradhha Shrikhetra) stands at the southern side of the town Rayagada. The temple was originally built more than 50 years back.

History 
Lord Jagannath, Balabhadra and Subhadra are the main deities in the temple. The present structure of the temple, with a new look,  has been built in 2007. The Gajapati Raja of Puri honoured the inaugural function of the new Temple on June 20, 2007. Rath yatra is the main festival of the deities.

Gallery

References 

Hindu temples in Rayagada district
Temples dedicated to Jagannath